Sudip K. Mazumder received his Ph.D. degree from Virginia Tech in 2001 and his M.S. degree from Rensselaer Polytechnic Institute (RPI) in 1993. At Virginia Tech, he conducted his doctoral work under the joint supervision of Prof. Dushan Boroyevich, a member of the U.S. National Academy of Engineering, past president of IEEE Power Electronics Society, and a renowned leader in power electronics, and late Prof. Ali H. Nayfeh, regarded as the most influential scholar and scientist in the area of applied nonlinear dynamics in mechanics and engineering. He also worked at Virginia Tech under the guidance of Emeritus Prof. Fred C. Lee, a member of the U.S. National Academy of Engineering and former president of IEEE Power Electronics Society.

Dr. Mazumder is the Director of Laboratory for Energy and Switching-Electronics Systems (LESES) and a professor in the Department of Electrical and Computer Engineering at the University of Illinois Chicago (UIC). He has over 30 years of professional experience and has held R&D and design positions in leading industrial organizations, and has served as Technical Consultant for several industries. He also serves as the President of NextWatt LLC, a small business organization that he setup in 2008.

He was named a Fellow of the American Association for the Advancement of Science (AAAS) in 2020 for distinguished contributions to the field of multi-scale control and analysis of power-electronic systems and a Fellow of the Institute of Electrical and Electronics Engineers (IEEE) in 2016 for his contributions to the analysis and control of power-electronic systems. He is also a Fellow of the Asia-Pacific Artificial Intelligence Association (AAIA) since 2022. He has also made original contributions to the areas of control of power-electronic systems at the semiconductor device level for numerous and wide-ranging applications in commercial and defense space; high-frequency-link power electronics, including hybrid-modulation-based pulsating-dc-link inverter and differential-mode-converter (ac/ac, dc/ac, ac/dc) topologies for applications encompassing but not limited to renewable and alternative energy, electric vehicles, solid-state transformer, energy storage, and offshore wind; discretized high-frequency and Boolean energy and data transfer; and optically-controlled power semiconductor devices (including optical emitter turn-off thyristor, heterojunction devices, high-gain bipolar devices, and hybrid and monolithic photoconductive semiconductor switches (PCSS)) and power electronics.  

He served as a Distinguished Lecturer for the IEEE Power Electronics Society (2016-2019), and since 2021, he has been serving as a Regional Distinguished Lecturer for the IEEE Power Electronics Society for the U.S. region. Since 2019 he has been serving as the Editor-at-Large for IEEE Transactions on Power Electronics, the leading journal in power electronics. He serves as an Administrative Committee Member and a Member at Large for the IEEE Power Electronics Society since 2015 and 2020, respectively. He also served as a Chair for The 2021 IEEE 12th International Symposium on Power Electronics for Distributed Generation Systems (PEDG 2021) and as a Chair for the IEEE Power Electronics Society's Technical Committee on Sustainable Energy Systems between 2015-2020. 

He is the recipient of the most prestigious awards at UIC, including Distinguished Researcher Award in Natural Sciences and Engineering (2020), Inventor of the Year Award (2014), and University Scholar Award (2013). He received several IEEE awards/honors, including IEEE Transactions on Power Electronics Prize Paper Awards (2022, 2002) and Highlighted Papers (2022, 2018), IEEE Conference Best Paper Award (2013), IEEE Outstanding Paper Award (2007), and IEEE International Future Energy Challenge Award (2005), Stanford University’s top-2% most-influential-scientist recognition (2022), Elsevier recognition of top 2% researcher in their fields for career-long productivity as well as top 2% researcher with single-year impact (2021, 2022), the U.S. Office of Naval Research (ONR) Young Investigator Award (2005) and the U.S. National Science Foundation (NSF) CAREER Award (2003). He was a National Merit Scholar in India in 1983 for ranking 9th out of about 250,000 students.

References

External links
 

20th-century births
Living people
Fellow Members of the IEEE
Year of birth missing (living people)
Place of birth missing (living people)